Marc Ramirez, better known as Dosem, is a Spanish record producer and DJ, from Girona, Catalonia. His sets consist of variants of techno and deep house.

After opening for Hong Kong-based DJ Technasia at an event in Barcelona, Dosem with his record label Sino in 2008, releasing the singles "Silent Drop" and "Bension01" in 2009 and 2010, followed by his critically acclaimed album Parallel in 2011. Dosem has regarded the following as some of his preferred equipment: Maschine from NI, Monark, Driver, Guitar Rig, Replika XT, Omnisphere, Spire, M1, Arturia Jupiter-8, Fabfilter Pro- L, UAD Massive Passive, Bax EQ, Moog Multimode Filter, Fairchild 660/670.

In September 2020, Dosem released the album Dream Decoder, much of which was composed during a visit to Tokyo. "Tower" was the first single release from the album.

Discography

Albums
Dream Decoder, Anjunadeep, 2020
City Cuts, Suara, 2014
Parallel, Sino, 2011

Singles & EPs
"Evidence", Truesoul, 2019
"Urban Code", Suara, 2014
"That Look", Suara, 2013
"Tales of Tomorrow", Tronic, 2012.
"Replicants", Suara, 2012
"Intruders", Suara, 2012
"Beyond Standards", Break New Soil, 2012
"Bension 01", Sino, 2010.
"Silent Drop", Sino, 2009.

References

Electronic dance music DJs
Spanish DJs
Progressive house musicians
Remixers